Cameron Hospital is a health facility in Cameron Road, Windygates, Fife, Scotland. It is managed by NHS Fife. The original building, known as Haig House, is a Category B listed building.

History 

Haig House, which was originally commissioned by the distiller John Haig for use as his home, was designed by David Bryce in the Scottish Baronial style and completed in 1849. It later became the family home of Field Marshal Earl Haig, his son.

An infectious diseases hospital was established on the site in 1912 when Haig House was converted into an administration block and ward pavilions were built in the grounds. A new administration block was completed in 1940 at which time Haig House was converted for use as a nurses' home. The building was used as a military hospital during the Second World War before joining the National Health Service as Cameron Hospital in 1948.

A tuberculosis treatment centre was added in 1955 and a 60-bed geriatric block was added in 1963.

References 

Hospitals in Fife
NHS Scotland hospitals
1912 establishments in Scotland
Hospitals established in 1912
Hospital buildings completed in 1849